15–16th & Locust station is the western terminus of the PATCO Speedline rapid transit route in the Rittenhouse Square neighborhood of Center City Philadelphia. The station has a single island platform with a fare mezzanine above.

Notable places nearby 
The station is within walking distance of the following notable places:
 Academy of Music
 Avenue of the Arts
 Kimmel Center for the Performing Arts
 Miller Theatre
 Rittenhouse Square
 University of the Arts
 Wilma Theater

References

External links 

 Official website at PATCO Speedline

PATCO Speedline stations in Philadelphia
Railway stations in Philadelphia
Railway stations in the United States opened in 1953
Railway stations located underground in Pennsylvania